The Men's 100 Breaststroke at the 10th FINA World Swimming Championships (25m) was swum 15–16 December 2010 in Dubai, United Arab Emirates. On 15 December, 85 individuals swam in the Preliminary heats in the morning, with the top-16 finishers advancing to swim again in the Semifinals that night. The top-8 finishers from the Semifinals then advanced to swim in the Final the next evening.

At the start of the event, the existing World (WR) and Championship records (CR) were:

The following records were established during the competition:

Results

Heats

Semifinals
Semifinal 1

Semifinal 2

Semifinals Swim-off

Final

References

Breaststroke 100 metre, Men's
World Short Course Swimming Championships